Sufism in Sindh covers the tradition of Sufism in Sindh, which is reputed to be an area of mystics. Sindh is famous for the enormous number of saints and mystics who lived there and preached peace and brotherhood. According to popular legend, 125,000 of them are buried on Makli Hill near Thatta. There is an abundance of Sufi literature produced in Sindh throughout history.

History 
According to some scholars the original torch-bearer of Sufism in Sindh was the 13th century saint Usman Marwandi, also known as Lal Shahbaz. These scholars believe that Sufism arrived in Sindh via Herat, Qandhar and Multan. Sufism reached its zenith in Sindh in the 18th century through the poetry of saints such as Shah Abdul Latif of Bhit and Sachal Sarmast of Daraz.

The mystic Husain ibn Mansur al Hallaj who is credited with the utterance "Anal Haqq" (I am The Creative Truth) reached Sindh in 905, proceeding from Gujarat. He travelled extensively throughout Sindh and discussed theological matters with local sages. He inspired many poets and musicians in the region. Sachal Sarmast was one of the greatest admirers of Mansur Hallaj and pays homage to him in his poetry frequently.

According to Michel Boivin, music is inseparable from Sufi poetry in Sindh. Sufism's relationship with music is ancient in the Indus Valley and was due to Baha' al-Din Zakariyya, the Suhrawardi saint from Multan, and Muin al-Din Chishti, the founder of the Chishtiyyah order. Baha' al-Dïn Zakariyya's son-in-law, Shaykh Hamid al-Din Hakim was a teacher of Sindhi dhakirs (specialists in poetry). By the close of the 15th century, Sindhi dhakirs had earned acclaim in Mughal courts.

The author of the Akbarnamah wrote that the kafi music originated from Sindh.  The art of 'musical narration' had received patronisation under the Surnrah dynasty of Sindh and was further developed and patronised under the Sammahs. The most renowned Sindhi genre of poetry is the kafi which, according to Annemarie Schimmel, is accompanied by instruments and is a vehicle of mystical songs. Shah 'Abd al-Latif is seen as the greatest renovator of Sufi music in Sindh. The most famous expression of Sufism in Sindh is found in the Risalo of Shah Abdul Latif Bhittai.

The philosophy of Persian poets deeply influenced Sindhi Sufistic thought and poetry. During Muslim rule in Sindh, the works of Rumi, Attar, Jami, Nizami Hafiz, Khayyam, Saadi and other poetic Persian mystics were keenly studied by both HIndu and Muslim scholars. Sachal was deeply influenced by Attar. Shah Abdul Latif was influenced by Maulana Jalaluddin Rumi.

Suffism became a primary marker of Sindhi identity for both Muslims and Hindus.

See also
 Sufism
 Sufism in Pakistan
 Syed Sharf Deen Baghdadi

References

Further reading
Ansari, Sarah FD. Sufi saints and state power: the pirs of Sind, 1843-1947. No. 50. Cambridge University Press, 1992.

 
Religion in Sindh
Sufism in Pakistan